William Henry Whitbread (4 February 1795 – 21 June 1867) was an English Whig and Liberal Party politician who sat in the House of Commons from 1818 to 1835.

Whitbread was the son of brewer  Samuel Whitbread and his wife Lady Elizabeth Grey, the eldest daughter of Charles Grey, 1st Earl Grey. He was educated at Eton College and Trinity College, Cambridge. He was awarded a M.A. in 1816 and became a partner with his brother Samuel Charles Whitbread in the brewing firm.

In 1818 Whitbread was elected as a Member of Parliament (MP) for Bedford and held the seat until 1835. He was a J.P. and Deputy Lieutenant for Bedfordshire and became High Sheriff of Bedfordshire in 1837.

Whitbread lived at Southill Park, Bedfordshire and died at the age of 72.

Whitbread married, Harriet Sneyd, daughter. of the Rev. Wettenhall Sneyd, of the Isle of Wight on 5 November 1845. They had no family.

References

External links

1795 births
1867 deaths
UK MPs 1832–1835
UK MPs 1818–1820
UK MPs 1820–1826
UK MPs 1826–1830
UK MPs 1830–1831
UK MPs 1831–1832
Masters of the Worshipful Company of Brewers
Members of the Parliament of the United Kingdom for English constituencies
Deputy Lieutenants of Bedfordshire
People educated at Eton College
Alumni of Trinity College, Cambridge
High Sheriffs of Bedfordshire
Whig (British political party) MPs
19th-century English businesspeople